Eric "E. D." Donald Hirsch Jr.  (born 1928) is an American educator, literary critic, and theorist of education. He is professor emeritus of education and humanities at the University of Virginia.

Hirsch is best known for his 1987 book Cultural Literacy, which was a national best-seller and a catalyst for the standards movement in American education. Cultural Literacy included a list of approximately 5,000 "names, phrases, dates, and concepts every American should know" in order to be "culturally literate." Hirsch's arguments for cultural literacy and the contents of the list were controversial and widely debated in the late 1980s and early '90s.

Hirsch is the founder and chairman of the non-profit Core Knowledge Foundation, which publishes and periodically updates the Core Knowledge Sequence, a set of unusually detailed curriculum guidelines for Pre-K through 8th grade.

In 1991, Hirsch and the Core Knowledge Foundation put out What Your First Grader Needs to Know, the first volume in what is popularly known as "the Core Knowledge Series." Additional volumes followed, as did revised editions. The series now begins with What Your Preschooler Needs to Know and ends with What Your Sixth Grader Needs to Know. The "series" books are based on the curriculum guidelines in the Core Knowledge Sequence. The books are used in Core Knowledge schools and other elementary schools. However, they have also been popular with homeschooling parents.

Before turning to education, Hirsch wrote on English literature and theory of interpretation (hermeneutics). His book Validity in Interpretation (1967) is considered an important contribution to hermeneutics. In it, Hirsch argues for intentionalism—the idea that the reader's goal should be to recover the author's meaning.

Early life 
Hirsch was born on March 22, 1928, in Memphis, Tennessee. His parents were Eric Donald Hirsch Sr. and Leah (Aschaffenburg) Hirsch. His father was a cotton broker who worked for Allenberg Cotton and was honored as "Cotton Man of the Year for 1956."

Hirsch was educated in Memphis public schools, the Pentecost Garrison School (Memphis), the Metairie Park Country Day School (New Orleans), and the Todd School for Boys (Woodstock, Illinois).

Education
In 1950, Hirsch graduated from Cornell University in Ithaca, New York with a B.A. in English. After a brief stint in the naval reserves, he enrolled in the Ph.D. program in English literature at Yale University in New Haven, Connecticut. He completed his doctorate in 1957.

Work on the Romantic poets
From 1956 to 1966, Hirsch taught in the English Department at Yale University. During this time most of his academic work concerned the English Romantic poets.

Hirsch's first book, Wordsworth and Schelling, was a revision of his doctoral dissertation. In the book, he explicates Wordsworth's philosophic ideas and poems by juxtaposing them with the ideas of the German philosopher Friedrich Schelling .

In 1964, Hirsch published his second book, Innocence and Experience: An Introduction to Blake. In this book Hirsch took issue with "systematic" critics of Blake's work, including Northrop Frye and Harold Bloom. Hirsch argued that Blake's ideas and outlook changed radically over time and that early works like The Songs of Innocence do not express the same worldview as later works like The Songs of Experience.

UVA and Hermeneutics

Hirsch was hired to teach English at the University of Virginia in Charlottesville, Virginia in 1966. The next year, he published Validity in Interpretation (1967). This was his first book-length work on hermeneutics and theory of interpretation. However, it was not his first published work on the subject. He had previously published an article, "Objective Interpretation" (PMLA, 1960) and a review of the German edition of Hans-Georg Gadamer's Truth and Method (Review of Metaphysics, 1965). Both of these early pieces are reprinted as appendices in Validity in Interpretation.

In Validity in Interpretation Hirsch defends what he calls "the sensible belief that a text means what its author meant." He argues that it is possible (at least in some cases) for readers to recover an author's intended meaning—and that readers should make this the goal of interpretation. Hirsch makes a distinction between the "meaning" of a text, which does not change over time, and the "significance" of the text, which does change over time. In addition, he argues that objectivity in interpretation is possible and that we can have objective knowledge in humanistic studies.

In a review of important works on interpretation, Sherri Irvin gives the following summary of Validity in Interpretation:   The seminal statement of actual intentionalism: Hirsch holds that ‘meaning is an affair of consciousness and not of physical signs or things’ (23), though he allows that linguistic convention constrains the meanings the author can intend for a particular utterance. He argues that the author's intention is necessary to fix meaning, since the application of conventions alone would typically leave a text wildly indeterminate.   Hirsch's "intentionalist" and "objectivist" views on hermeneutics are close to those of the Italian jurist Emilio Betti. On the other hand, his views run largely contrary to the views of Martin Heidegger and his student Hans-Georg Gadamer as well as the views of W. K. Wimsatt and Monroe Beardsley on the "semantic autonomy" of works of literature, as expressed in "The Intentional Fallacy."

Hirsch continued to publish on hermeneutics and the concept of authorial intent in the late 1960s and early 1970's, and many of his articles from this period are collected in his second book on hermeneutics, The Aims of Interpretation (1975).

Hirsch's views on hermeneutics have been widely cited—Google Scholar lists more than 4,400 citations for Validity in Interpretation—but they have also been widely criticized.

Composition and Theory of Writing
In the early 1970s Hirsch began working  on the theory of writing and composition, publishing several articles and a book, The Philosophy of Composition (1977). The central concept in this book is the idea of "relative readability." One piece of writing is more readable, in terms of relative readability, than another if it conveys the same meaning but is easier to read and is read more quickly than the alternative passage. The Philosophy of Composition was widely reviewed and generated a lot of discussion in composition circles for several years, but Hirsch's work in this area is no longer widely discussed.

In the late 1970s, Hirsch and some colleagues at the University of Virginia ran a series of experiments on relative readability. Participants in the experiments were assigned either a well written passage or a poorly written (stylistically degraded) version of the same passage. Hirsch and his colleagues recorded reading time to determine whether the well written passages were in fact read more quickly, as they predicted they would be. They discovered that they were. However, they also discovered that there was another factor that was even more important than relative readability: if the students lacked crucial background knowledge, they struggled to read both the poorly written and the well written passage. This became particularly clear while Hirsch was running tests at a Virginia community college. The students at the community college did not know who Ulysses S. Grant and Robert E. Lee were and, as a result, they struggled to make sense of a passage on the U.S. Civil War. Hirsch observed that these students lacked "cultural literacy." They had adequate decoding skills for reading, but they began to struggle when they lacked relevant background knowledge.

Cultural Literacy 

Hirsch was dismayed that community college students, raised in Virginia, where much of the Civil War was fought, had not heard of Robert E. Lee, who commanded the Confederate States Army or Ulysses S. Grant, who led the Union Army, or the roles these men played in the American Civil War. He began to push for the teaching of cultural literacy in grades K-12, and especially K-8. His main objective, as he has frequently noted, was to help disadvantaged students to cultural literacy and improved reading comprehension.

In a 1981 presentation to the Modern Language Association, Hirsch introduced his theory on the connection between literacy in general and cultural literacy. A version of his MLA paper was published in 1983 as an article, "Cultural Literacy," in The American Scholar.

In 1983, the Exxon Education Foundation provided support for further research. With this funding, Hirsch set up a team who began to compile lists of terms that "culturally literate" people know but young people and disadvantaged people may need to learn. This would become the appendix of his 1987 book, an unannotated list of approximately "5,000 names, phrases, dates, and concepts," representing the "necessary minimum of American general knowledge".

In 1986, Hirsch established the non-profit Cultural Literacy Foundation, with a goal of developing a fact-rich core curriculum and piloting it in selected elementary schools.

In 1987, Hirsch's Cultural Literacy appeared. The book became a national bestseller, rising to #2 on the New York Times Bestseller lists. Hirsch's book was often reviewed with and discussed in tandem with another education book published at roughly the same time, Allan Bloom's The Closing of the American Mind. These two books convinced many readers that there were problems with American education. Hirsch's book "spurred a growing movement for prescriptive cultural literacy and standards in general." This resulted in a recommendation by the United States Department of Education that "cultural literacy should inform the content of the American educational system."

Hirsch has distanced himself from Bloom book, saying that "That was just bad luck ... Allan Bloom really was an elitist."

In 1988, Hirsch co-authored the Dictionary of Cultural Literacy with Joseph Kett and James Trefil. In 1989, Hirsch was the editor of A First Dictionary of Cultural Literacy. In 1991, Hirsch and his colleagues issued What Your First Grader Needs to Know, the first in the popular Core Knowledge "series."

One early supporter of the Core Knowledge movement was Columbia University's Diane Ravitch, an education historian. Against the backdrop of the release of a scathing report on education in the United States—A Nation at Risk—Ravitch encouraged Hirsch to publish Cultural Literacy as a non-fiction book in 1987. The book included an unannotated list of approximately "5,000 names, phrases, dates, and concepts" every American should know in order to be culturally literate.

By 1988, Hirsch was featured in the New York Times, as a "self-proclaimed crusade against noneducation" in his role as president of the Cultural Literacy Foundation which was headquartered in Charlottesville. The Foundation monitored the "spread of ignorance and illiteracy in the United States" and made "proposals for remedying it".

By 1990, the Core Knowledge  had approximately 2,500 members and was largely self-supporting, although they continued to use grant money for large projects.

By 2015, Hirsch and his Core Knowledge Foundation, had become an "increasingly popular primary source for the Common Core movement". The emphasis is placed "more on what should be known rather than how to know"—"content knowledge" is central to learning and "knowledge acquisition is treated as a commodity or product to be dispensed".

Criticism of school systems
In his 1996 book The Schools We Need and Why We Don't Have Them, Hirsch was highly critical of the American education system, which he described as a "Thoughtworld" hostile to research-based findings and dissenting ideas.

Throughout his career, Hirsch denounced the influence of 19th century romanticism on American culture in general, and on progressive educational ideas in particular. He said that romanticism, and writers and artists who espoused the romantic world-view — such as Jean-Jacques Rousseau, William Blake, William Wordsworth, Friedrich Wilhelm Joseph Schelling, and Samuel Taylor Coleridge — "elevated all that is natural and disparaged all that is artificial". Hirsch sees the romanticism-inspired progressivists as being in opposition to the intellectuals — the classicist, the modernist, the pragmatist, and the scientist.

In The Schools We Need Hirsch said that, "Higher-level skills critically depend upon the automatic mastery of repeated lower-level activities." In his 1999 book, The Schools Our Children Deserve: Moving Beyond Traditional Classrooms and Tougher Standards, Alfie Kohn said that Hirsch's "starting with the basics" model  "reflects a particular model of learning"—behaviorism—"which has lost credibility among experts in the field even as it retains a stranglehold on the popular consciousness".

In 2006, Hirsch published The Knowledge Deficit, in which he continued the argument made in Cultural Literacy.  Disappointing results on reading tests, Hirsch argued, can be traced back to a knowledge deficit that keeps students from making sense of what they read.

In 2009, he published The Making of Americans: Democracy and Our Schools, in which he makes the case that the true mission of the schools is to prepare citizens for participation in our democracy by embracing a common-core, knowledge-rich curriculum as opposed to what Hirsch claims to be the current content-free approach.  He laments 60 years without a curriculum in US schools because of the anti-curriculum approach championed by John Dewey and other Progressives.

In 2016, he published "Why Knowledge Matters: Rescuing our Children from Failed Educational Theories", outlining the three major problems with education in the United States: the emphasis on teaching skills, such as critical thinking skills, rather than knowledge, individualism rather than communal learning, and developmentalism, that is, teaching children what is "appropriate" for their age.

Core Knowledge
Hirsch established the non-profit Core Knowledge Foundation and serves as its director. The Foundation began publishing its Core Knowledge Sequence in the 1990s. This includes eight books as part of the Core Knowledge Grader Series of books. The series begins What Your Preschooler Needs to Know and ends with What Your Sixth Grader Needs to Know. The series, which has been revised and updated over the years, have been particularly popular with parents who homeschool, as well as parents whose children attend Core Knowledge schools.

In 2011 a British version of The Core Knowledge Sequence was published online. The books began to be adapted for the UK, beginning with What Your Year 1 Child Needs to Know.

By 2015, there were about 1,260 schools in the US (across 46 states and District of Columbia) using all or part of the Core Knowledge Sequence. The Foundation believes that the actual number is much higher, but only counts schools that submit a "profile form" to the Foundation annually. The profile of Core Knowledge Schools in the US is diverse—including public, charter, private and parochial schools in urban, suburban and rural locations. Independent nonprofit GreatSchools.org reports that more than 400 of these schools are preschools.

In his 2014 article published by Thomas B. Fordham Institute, Robert Pondiscio, the author of How the Other Half Learns in which he reviewed Success Academy, Pondiscio said if the Common Core State Standards Initiative was "properly understood and implemented", it would be a "delivery mechanism" for Hirsch's "ideas and work" and his Core Knowledge curriculum. Hirsch was not directly involved in developing the Common Core State Standards adopted in 46 states and the District of Columbia, some education watchers credit E. D. Hirsch as having provided the "intellectual foundation" for the initiative. Pondiscio said that Politico had paired  David Coleman—main author of the Common Core State Standards in English Language Arts—with Hirsch in eight place on their 2014 list of fifty "thinkers, doers and dreamers who really matter."

Reviews of Hirsch's work
Since Hirsch's "Cultural Literacy" was published in the 1980s, his theories have often been embraced by political conservatives and criticized by liberals and progressives.

A 1999 Baltimore Sun article said Hirsch's system had succeeded in "producing educated children" but ignited an "education controversy" which has been "very good for [Hirsch's] business". Hirsch said that he specifically designed a curriculum that would "place all children on common ground, sharing a common body of knowledge. That's one way to secure civil rights."

Sol Stern, a senior fellow at the Manhattan Institute who has written extensively on education reform, described Hirsch's "curriculum for democracy" in 2009, as "content-rich pedagogy" that makes better citizens and smarter kids. Sterne said in 2013 that Hirsch was "the most important education reformer of the past half-century." Stern said that William Bennett, a prominent conservative who served as Chair of the National Endowment for the Humanities and later US Secretary of Education, was an early proponent of Hirsch's views.

The Core Knowledge Foundation self-describes itself as non-partisan. Hirsch himself is an avowed Democrat who has described himself as "practically a socialist" In his 2010 article in the Claremont Review of Books, Terrence O. Moore cited Hirsch, who self-described as a "political liberal" had been "forced to become an educational conservative". Moore said that Hirsch's Left was the "Old Left". In The Making of Americans (2010), Hirsch said that, he was a "political liberal" who was "forced to become an educational conservative" after he had "recognized the relative inertness and stability of the shared background knowledge students need to master reading and writing." He said that the "democratic goal of high universal literacy would require schools to practice a large measure of educational traditionalism".

In his 2009 article, published online by Grove City College's Institute for Faith and Freedom, Jason R. Edwards—who teaches education and history at Grove City College—said that Hirsch has been criticized by the political left for being an "elitist" whose theories could result in a "rejection of toleration, pluralism, and relativism". On the political right, Hirsch has been accused of being "totalitarian, for his idea lends itself to turning over curriculum selection to federal authorities and thereby eliminating the time-honored American tradition of locally controlled schools".

Harvard University professor Howard Gardner, who is best known for his theory of multiple intelligences, has been a long-time critic of Hirsch. Gardner described one of his own books, The Disciplined Mind (1999), as part of a "sustained dialectic" with E. D. Hirsch, and criticized Hirsch's curriculum as "at best superficial and at worst anti-intellectual". In 2007, Gardner accused Hirsch of having "swallowed a neoconservative caricature of contemporary American education."

UK Education Secretary (Michael Gove)

Michael Gove, who served as served as Shadow Secretary of State for Children, Schools and Families and then Secretary of State for Education under Prime Minister David Cameron from 2010 to 2014, oversaw major controversial education reforms. Gove admired Hirsch's theories of education, according to a 2012 article in The Guardian. Gove revised the national curriculum, which included "hard facts", allegedly influenced by Hirsch. In 2014, the Core Knowledge books were published in the U.K. by Civitas, which is widely characterised in the national news media as "right-of-centre". Standardized testing conducted by the Office for Standards in Education, Children's Services and Skills (Ofsted) had faced criticism since at least 2008, as a threat to social learning.

A 2010 article in the U.K.-based TES described Core Knowledge as a "kind of national curriculum" that outlines Hirsch's ideas on what "children should know in English language and literature, history, geography, maths, science, music, and art".

Influence in other countries

Portugal 
E. D. Hirsch was first invited to Portugal in 2004 by the then minister of education David Justino and then participated at two conferences organized by Nuno Crato. On the occasion, he was interviewed by various media. His points of view were part of the public educational debate developed for a few years after his visit. 

Later, his ideas were very influential, namely during the tenure of minister Nuno Crato (2011–2015) in which the curricula were reorganized and detailed learning outcomes ("metas curriculares") were introduced. These learning outcomes explicitly highlight the essential knowledge students should master and were built in a progressive, systematic, and layered fashion inspired by Hirsch's ideas. Various analysts attribute to these rigorous and demanding standards, among other factors, the notable 2015 improvement in Portuguese student results in PISA and TIMSS international studies.

Personal life
Hirsch was married to Gertrud Erna Winkelsen from 1956 and from 1958 to Mary Monteith Pope until her death in 2015. He is currently married to Natasha "Tasha" Tobin.

He has four children.

Fellowships, awards and memberships 
Hirsch has been awarded several fellowships and honors, including the Fulbright Fellowship (1955), the Morse Fellowship (1960), the Guggenheim Fellowship (1964), the Explicator Prize (1965), the NEA Fellowship (1970), the NEH Senior Fellowship (1971–71), the Wesleyan University Center for the Humanities Fellowship (1973), the Princeton University Fellowship in the Humanities (1977), and the Center for Advanced Study in the Behavioral Sciences Fellowship at Stanford University (1980–81).

At the University of Virginia he was Linden Kent Memorial Professor of English Emeritus, in addition to Professor of Education and Humanities.

He has received honorary degrees from Rhodes College and  Williams College.

He is a member of the American Academy of Arts and Sciences, and a board member of the Albert Shanker Institute. He lives in Charlottesville, Virginia.

Works 
 Wordsworth and Schelling (1960)
 Innocence and Experience: An Introduction to Blake (1964)
 Validity in Interpretation (Yale University Press, 1967) 
 The Aims of Interpretation (1976)
 The Philosophy of Composition (1977)
 Cultural Literacy: What Every American Needs to Know (1987)
 The Dictionary of Cultural Literacy (1988)
 The Schools We Need: And Why We Don't Have Them (1996)
 "The Validity of Allegory" in Convegno internazionale sul tema ermeneutica e critica (1996) 
 The New Dictionary of Cultural Literacy: What Every American Needs to Know by E. D. Hirsch, Joseph F. Kett and James Trefil (2002)
 The Knowledge Deficit: Closing the Shocking Education Gap for American Children (2006) 
 The Making of Americans: Democracy and Our Schools (2010)
 Why Knowledge Matters (2016)
 How to Educate a Citizen: The Power of Shared Knowledge to Unify a Nation (2020)

See also 
 The Core Knowledge Foundation
Daniel T. Willingham

Notes

References

Publications by Hirsch and the Core Knowledge Foundation

Further reading 
Commentary
 Aeschliman, M.D., "Culture and Anarchy" Review of E.D. Hirsch, Cultural Literacy, The World and I (Washington, DC), February 1988
 Ibid., "Core Knowledge in the TASIS Schools: England, Puerto Rico, Switzerland," Common Knowledge, 2005
 Ibid., “What Do They Know?” Review of E.D. Hirsch, "The Knowledge Deficit," The Weekly Standard (Washington, DC ), 29 January 2007
 Ibid., “Suffer the Little Children” The Intercollegiate Review, Fall 2010
 
 
 Aeschliman, M.D., "Spare the Truth, Spoil the Child," First Things (NY), Web Exclusive, 5 September 2022

Criticism
 The Schools Our Children Deserve by Alfie Kohn
 Critical Literacy by Eugene F. Provenzo
 Literacies of Power by Donoldo Macedo

External links 
Core Knowledge Foundation
Information at Hoover Institution
Public School Insights interview with E.D. Hirsch Posted September 2, 2008
Profile of Hirsch at PhilWeb
 Hirsch Discusses his book The Making of Americans on C-Span. Video
 .
 Christopher Hitchens, "Why We Don't Know What We Don't Know," New York Times, May 13, 1990
 Hirsch's papers on cultural literacy at the Albert and Shirley Small Special Collections Library at the University of Virginia
  A collection of articles and speeches by  E. D. Hirsch

1928 births
Living people
Jewish American academics
American literary critics
Cornell University alumni
Wesleyan University faculty
People from Memphis, Tennessee
University of Virginia
Yale University alumni
Hermeneutics
21st-century American Jews
Yale University faculty